An okrug is a type of administrative division in some Slavic states. The word okrug is a loanword in English, alternatively translated as area, district, or region. 

Etymologically, okrug literally means 'circuit', derived from Proto-Slavic , in turn from  "around" +  "circle". In meaning, the word is similar to the German term Bezirk or Kreis ('district') and the French word arrondissement; all of which refer to something "encircled" or "surrounded".

Bulgaria

In Bulgaria, s are the abolished primary unit of the administrative division and implied "districts" or "counties". They existed in the postwar Bulgaria between 1946 and 1987 and corresponded approximately to today's oblasts.

Poland

As historical administrative subdivisions of Poland,  existed in the later part of the Congress Poland period, from 1842, when the name was applied to the former powiats (the name  being transferred to the former obwody). See: subdivisions of Congress Poland.

 were also created temporarily from 1945 to 1946, in the areas annexed to Poland from Germany as a result of the Soviet military advance. An  was then subdivided into .

Russia

Imperial Russia
Okrugs were one of the several types of administrative division for oblasts and selected governorates in Imperial Russia. Until the 1920s, okrugs were administrative districts in Cossack hosts such as the Don Cossacks.

Soviet Union

Inherited from Imperial Russia, in the 1920s, okrugs were administrative divisions of several other primary divisions such as oblasts, krais, and others. For some time in the 1920s they also served as the primary unit upon the abolishment of guberniyas and were divided into raions. On July 30, 1930, most of the okrugs were abolished. The remaining okrugs were phased out in the Russian SFSR during 1930–1946, although they were retained in Zakarpattia Oblast of the Ukrainian SSR in a status equivalent to that of a raion.

National okrugs were first created in the Mountain ASSR of the Russian SFSR in 1921 as units of the Soviet autonomy and additional national okrugs were created in the Russian SFSR for the peoples of the north and Caucasus region. In 1977, all national okrugs were renamed autonomous okrugs.

Russian Federation

In the present-day Russian Federation, the term okrug is either translated as district or rendered directly as okrug, and is used to describe the following types of divisions:
Federal Districts, such as the Siberian Federal District
Autonomous okrugs, such as Chukotka Autonomous Okrug

After the series of mergers in 2005–2008, several autonomous okrugs of Russia lost their federal subject status and are now considered to be administrative territories within the federal subjects they had been merged into:
Agin-Buryat Okrug, a territory with special status within Zabaykalsky Krai
Komi-Permyak Okrug, a territory with special status within Perm Krai
Koryak Okrug, a territory with special status within Kamchatka Krai
Ust-Orda Buryat Okrug, a territory with special status within Irkutsk Oblast

Okrug is also used to describe the administrative divisions of the two "federal cities" in Russia:
the administrative okrugs of Moscow are an upper-level administrative division
the municipal okrugs of St. Petersburg are a lower-level administrative division

In the federal city of Sevastopol, municipal okrugs are a type of a municipal formation.

In Tver Oblast, the term okrug also denotes a type of an administrative division which is equal in status to that of the districts.

Furthermore, the designation okrug denotes several selsoviet-level administrative divisions:
okrugs, such as okrugs of Samara Oblast
rural okrugs, such as the rural okrugs of Belgorod Oblast
rural territorial okrugs, such as the rural territorial okrugs of Murmansk Oblast
stanitsa okrugs, such as the stanitsa okrugs of Krasnodar Krai

In some cities, the term okrug is used to refer to the administrative divisions of those cities.  Administrative okrugs are such divisions in the cities of Murmansk, Omsk, and Tyumen; city okrugs are used in Krasnodar; municipal okrugs are the divisions of Nazran; okrugs exist in Belgorod, Kaluga, Kursk, and Novorossiysk; and territorial okrugs are the divisions of Arkhangelsk and Lipetsk.

The term okrug is also used to describe a type of a municipal formation, the municipal urban okrug—a municipal urban settlement not incorporated into a municipal district.

Serbia

The Republic of Serbia is divided into twenty-nine okrugs as well as the City of Belgrade. The term okrug in Serbia is often translated as either district or county.

See also
Administrative division
Krai
Military district
Oblast

Notes

References

External links
 Okruha in the Encyclopedia of Ukraine

Types of administrative division
Administrative divisions of Russia
Russian-language designations of territorial entities
Former types of subdivisions of Serbia
Former types of subdivisions of Bosnia and Herzegovina